Archidendron vaillantii, commonly known as the salmon bean, is an evergreen tree in the legume family Fabaceae. It is endemic to the rainforests of northeast Queensland.

Description

Taxonomy
This species was first described in April 1865 by the German born Victorian Government botanist Ferdinand von Mueller, who published a description in his tome Fragmenta phytographiæ Australiæ. His description was based on material collected by John Dallachy in the Seaview Range west of Ingham. Mueller revised his description later in the same year and transferred the species to Archidendron. 

The taxon was reviewed twice more — first by Carl Ernst Otto Kuntze in 1891, giving it the combination Affonsea vailantii, and then by Alfred James Ewart in 1907 who described a subspecies Albizia vaillantii var. pentzkeana, however, neither of these names are now accepted.

Etymology
The genus name Archidendron is a combination of the Latin prefix archi- meaning "main", "chief" or "leading", and the Ancient Greek word δένδρον (déndron), meaning "tree". The species epithet vaillantii was coined by Mueller to honour the French botanist Sébastien Vaillant.

Distribution and habitat
The salmon bean is restricted to the coastal area from about Rossville south to the Paluma Range National Park.

Conservation
This species, which is endemic to Queensland, has been classified by the Queensland Department of Environment and Science (DES) as least concern, but DES provides no explanation as to the process of, or the reason for, this assessment. 

In September 2010 the International Union for Conservation of Nature (IUCN) assessed it as near threatened. The justification for this assessment published by IUCN cites the reduction of the species' natural habitat, and the existence of the pathogen Phytophthora cinnamomi within its range.

Gallery

References

External links
 
 
 View a map of historical sightings of this species at the Australasian Virtual Herbarium
 View observations of this species on iNaturalist
 View images of this species on Flickriver

vaillantii
Endemic flora of Queensland
Taxa named by Ferdinand von Mueller
Plants described in 1865